The Parmigiano dialect, sometimes anglicized as the Parmesan dialect, (al djalètt pramzàn) is a variety of the Emilian language spoken in the Province of Parma, the western-central portion of the Emilia-Romagna administrative region.

Terminology

The term dialetto, usually translated as dialect in English, is commonly used in reference to all local Romance languages native to Italy, many of which are not mutually intelligible with Standard Italian and all of which have developed from Vulgar Latin independently.  Parmigiano is no exception and is a variety of Emiliano-Romagnolo, not of Italian.

Classification

Parmigiano is a subdialect of Emilian, which is itself a dialect of the Emiliano-Romagnolo language, which is identified as "definitely endangered" by UNESCO. There is a high degree of mutual intelligibility among the various Emilian-Romagnol dialects. Emiliano-Romagnolo is part of the Gallo-Italic family, which also includes Piedmontese, Ligurian, and Lombard language. Ligurian, in particular, has influenced Parmigiano.

History
Parmigiano has much of the history as Emilian, but at some point, it diverged from other versions of that linguistic group. It now lies somewhere between Western Emilian, which includes Piacentino, and Central Emilian, which includes Reggiano and Modenese. Like the other Emilian dialects, it has fewer speakers than ever because of political, social and economic factors, but La Repubblica has suggested that it is changing. It is still declining but more slowly, as parents are keen to preserve their ancestral roots.

Its origins are with Gauls, who occupied the Parma area in around 400 BC, who had stayed there after the invasion of the Romans. The lexicon was therefore a type of Latin influenced by Gaulish. The Gauls, or Celts, left their mark on modern Parmigiano in some words today, such as gozèn "pig", scrana "chair" and sôga "rope". As a result of Spanish and especially French invasions, Parmigiani began to use words which came from a French language that had Latin roots. That is seen in tirabusòn "corkscrew" (similar to Modern French's tire-bouchon) vert "open" (French: ouvert), pòmm da téra "potato" (French: pomme de terre) and many other words.

Geographic distribution
Parmigiano is mainly spoken in the province of Parma. The vocabulary and vowels vary across the region, particularly between the urban and rural dialects, as there was once little mobility from within to outside the city walls. The dialect spoken outside Parma is often called Arioso or Parmense within the city itself, but variation is less pronounced than it once was. The dialect spoken in Casalmaggiore in the Province of Cremona to the north of Parma is closely related to Parmigiano. Parmigiano subdialects have three forms: 
Low Parmigiano, which is native to a northern part of the province that lies between the Po and the Via Aemilia and whose largest town is Colorno. 
Western Parmigiano, which is heard around Fidenza and Salsomaggiore Terme and has been strongly influenced by Piacentino, another Emilian language.
High Parmigiano, which has been affected by Ligurian and is spoken in the Apennine region to the south.

An example of the variation is the word bombèn "very well". In 1861, the popular forms were moltbein and monbén, but it has also taken these forms: montben, mondbén, moltbén, moltbein, monbén, and mombén. In the "Western Parmigiano" it's used a variety of locutions with the same meaning of bombèn, such as bèn a bota or bèn da bòn.

Official status
Parmigiano is not recognised as a minority dialect in the European Union or in Italy; the same is true for Emilian or Emilian-Romagnol. Since 27 June 2000, Italy has been a signatory of the Council of Europe's European Charter for Regional or Minority Languages, which aims to protect and promote historical regional and minority languages in Europe, but it has not ratified it.

Writing system

Parmigiano is written using the Latin alphabet, but spelling can vary within a dialect. It has never been standardised, and the language is rarely written.

Still, a number of Parmigani-Italian dictionaries have been published. Angelo Mazza and translator Clemente Bondi were prolific writers of poetry in Parmigiano. Most of the works were first published in the late 1700s or the early to mid-1800s.

Grammar
Parmigiano is a synthetic language like Italian and French (but much less so than Classical Latin) and shares several notable features with most other Romance languages:

 loss of Latin's declension and the neuter grammatical gender for nouns
 development of grammatical articles from Latin demonstratives
 new tenses formed from auxiliaries

Nouns and most pronouns are inflected for number (singular or plural); adjectives, for the number and gender (masculine or feminine) of their nouns; personal pronouns, for person, number, gender, and case; and verbs, for mood, tense, and the person and number of their subjects. Case is primarily marked using word order and prepositions, and certain verb features are marked using auxiliary verbs.

Negation 
Parmigiano expresses negation in two parts, with the particle n attached to the verb (often adding the pleonastic particle "gh") and one or more negative words (connegatives) that modify the verb or one of its arguments. Negation encircles a conjugated verb with n after the subject and the negative adverb after the conjugated verb, For example, the simple verbal negation is expressed by n before the finite verb (and any object pronouns) and the adverb miga after the finite verb. That is a feature it has in common with French, which uses ne and pas. Pas derives from the Latin passus "step", and miga "breadcrumb" also signifies a small quantity (Ex. "A n'gh'o miga vist Zvan incó", meaning "I have not seen John today").

Samples 

Here is a sample of Parmigiano, compared to Italian and English, but even within a dialect, there is variation.

Words

References

Bibliography

Emilia (region of Italy)
Emilian-Romagnol language